The Nicholls Colonels football program is the intercollegiate American football team for Nicholls State University located in Thibodaux, Louisiana, United States. The team competes in the NCAA Division I Football Championship Subdivision (FCS) and are members of the Southland Conference. Nicholls' first football team was fielded in 1972. The team plays its home games at the 10,500 seat Manning Field at John L. Guidry Stadium in Thibodaux, Louisiana. The Colonels are coached by Tim Rebowe.

History
Source:

Conference affiliations

Championships

Conference championships 
1975 Gulf South Conference Champions (Division II)Head Coach: Bill ClementsOverall Record (8–2)Conference Record (7–2)
1984 Gulf Star Conference Champions (Division I-AA)Head Coach: Sonny JacksonOverall Record (6–5)Gulf Star Conference Record (4–1)
2005 Southland Conference Champions (Division I-AA)Head Coach: Jay ThomasOverall Record (6–5)Southland Conference Record (5–1)
2018 Southland Conference Champions (Football Championship Subdivision)Head Coach: Tim ReboweOverall Record (8–3)Southland Conference Record (7–2)
2019 Southland Conference Champions (Football Championship Subdivision)Head Coach: Tim ReboweOverall Record (8–4)Southland Conference Record (7–2)

Head coaches 

*1996 I-AA National Coach of the Year, Eddie Robinson Award Recipient**Interim head coach for final nine games of 2014 season

Division I-AA/Division I FCS Playoffs

Notable players

All-Americans

Nicholls Colonels selected in the NFL Draft

Stadium

Manning Field at John L. Guidry Stadium

Manning Field at John L. Guidry Stadium is a 10,500-seat multi-purpose stadium in Thibodaux, Louisiana. It is home to the Nicholls Colonels football team of the Southland Conference in the Football Championship Subdivision (FCS). The stadium is named in honor of former state representative John L. Guidry who was instrumental in the establishment of Francis T. Nicholls Junior College. The playing surface is named Manning Field after the Manning family (Peyton, Eli, Cooper and Archie) because the family holds the annual Manning Passing Academy football camp at the facility. The current playing surface is GeoGreen Replicated Grass. The stadium was officially dedicated on September 16, 1972.

The stadium features a three-level press box on the west side with a photo deck located on the roof. The president's suite and a 30-seat club level is located on the third level. The second level houses an area for game management staff, television, radio and coaches' booths and a working press area. On the ground level is the Colonels Club Room. Members use the club room as a hospitality area before home football games as well as for various university functions throughout the year.

On June 12, 2019, Nicholls announced a new $6.5 million, 20,000-square-foot football operations center will be built in the south end zone along with an expansion and renovation of the Frank L. Barker Athletic Building. The football team will move from the Barker Athletic Building to the football operations center starting with the 2020 Nicholls Football season. The football operations center will include a new locker room, players’ lounge, 142-seat team meeting room with stadium-style seating, training room, equipment room, coaches’ and staff offices, position and group meeting rooms, catering kitchen and team lobby. The team meeting room will also function as a gameday club seating area with a large window overlooking the field. Construction of an indoor training facility located behind the football operations center will begin after completion of the football operations center.

Practice and training facilities

Frank L. Barker Athletic Building

The Frank L. Barker Athletic Building or Barker Hall is located adjacent to Manning Field at John L. Guidry Stadium. It houses the Nicholls Colonels football coaches’ offices, locker rooms, meeting rooms, athletic training rooms and athletic staff.

The Nicholls Athletics Hall of Fame is also located in the building.

Leonard C. Chabert Strength and Conditioning Facility

The Nicholls Colonels Strength and Conditioning facility is located in the Leonard C. Chabert Strength and Conditioning Facility or Leonard C. Chabert Hall. The facility has multi-purpose power stations, weight machines, dumbbell stations, elliptical machines and stationary bikes. It is the strength and conditioning facility and nutrition center for Nicholls athletics.

Football practice fields

The Nicholls Colonels football practice fields include three natural grass football practice fields located across Acadia Drive from Manning Field at John L. Guidry Stadium, the Frank L. Barker Athletic Building and the Leonard C. Chabert Strength and Conditioning Facility. Two of the fields face in a north-south configuration similar to Manning Field at John L. Guidry Stadium with a third facing in an east-west configuration.

Rivalries

Southeastern Louisiana

Nicholls and Southeastern Louisiana are located 94 miles apart and no two football-playing schools in the Southland Conference are as close as the two schools. The winner of the annual football game is awarded the River Bell Trophy. The trophy features a river bell, the teams athletic logos and details the yearly victors. The game played between the rivals began in 1972 and was played annually until 1985 when Southeastern Louisiana dropped its football program. It resumed 20 years later in 2005 when football was reinstated by the university.

Northwestern State

The football rivalry game with Northwestern State is played annually with the winner being awarded the NSU Trophy. Both universities are located in Louisiana and are members of the Southland Conference. The first game in the series was played in 1973.

Texas State

In fall 1998, the Colonels were scheduled to take on the Texas State Bobcats. Prior to the game, heavy rains flooded San Marcos, Texas and the playing field at Texas State. Athletic directors and coaches from both schools decided to postpone the game and coined the annual contest the "Battle for the Paddle," joking that fans and athletes needed to use a boat and paddle to get to the game. The game was eventually played on November 28, 1998 with Texas State prevailing 28–27 to win the first "Battle for the Paddle". A wooden oar or paddle named the "Paddle Trophy" was awarded to the winner of the contest.

Future opponents

Future Football Bowl Subdivision opponents  
Source:

Media
The Colonels are broadcast on Cox Sports Television. Cox Sports Television is available to 4 million viewers across 18 states. CST has over 40 affiliates in Louisiana, including New Orleans and Baton Rouge. "Voice of the Colonels" Jack Benjamin will provide play-by-play for the broadcasts and will be joined in the booth by Ronnie Rantz. The games also can be heard on the Colonel Sports Radio Network via 1600 AM KLEB, and on the TuneIn app and website.

See also
 List of NCAA Division I FCS football programs
 Nicholls Colonels

References

External links
 

 
American football teams established in 1972
1972 establishments in Louisiana